Auburndale is a station on the Long Island Rail Road's Port Washington Branch in the Auburndale neighborhood of Queens, New York City. The station is part of CityTicket. The station is on 192nd Street between Station Road and 39th Avenue, three blocks north of Northern Boulevard.

History 
Auburndale station was originally built in 1901, the year the community itself was developed. The original station house was sold and converted into an Episcopal Church on 42nd Avenue and Utopia Parkway when a new elevated station was built in 1930 as part of a grade crossing elimination project. This church closed in 1973. The elevated platform was renovated between 2004 and 2005.

Station layout
This station has one 10-car long island platform between the two tracks.

References

External links

Unofficial LIRR History website
1999 Shelter Photos from Platform and View of shelter from the bridge
Street-Level Staircase Tunnel and Current Shelter (January 7, 2007)
 192nd Street entrance from Google Maps Street View
Platform from Google Maps Street View
Platform Waiting Room from Google Maps Street View

Long Island Rail Road stations in New York City
Railway stations in the United States opened in 1901

Railway stations in Queens, New York